Carabus exiguus tagong is a black-coloured subspecies of ground beetle in the subfamily Carabinae that is endemic to Western part of Sichuan, China.

References

exiguus tagong
Beetles described in 2007
Beetles of Asia
Endemic fauna of Sichuan